KSTZ (102.5 FM, "Star 102.5") is a commercial FM radio station in Des Moines, Iowa. The station airs a hot adult contemporary radio format. KSTZ is part of Saga Communications' Des Moines Radio Group, with studios located on Locust Street in Des Moines.

KSTZ has an effective radiated power (ERP) of 92,000 watts (100,000 watts with beam tilt).  The transmitter is located off Ankeny Boulevard (U.S. Route 69) near Alleman.  KSTZ broadcasts in the HD Radio format.  The HD2 subchannel carries a classic country format known as "93.7 The Outlaw - Legends and Young Guns", which is also relayed on 250-watt translator station K229CC, at 93.7 MHz.

History
The station signed on the air in 1970 as KRNT-FM.   It was the FM counterpart to KRNT (AM 1350).  Both stations were owned by the Cowles family, publishers of the Des Moines Register.  During those early years, Drake-Chenault's automated "Hit Parade" format was aired.

In 1974, the station became KRNQ ("Q-102").  That year, Cowles sold KRNQ and KRNT (AM) to Stauffer Communications of Topeka, Kansas. The two stations were sold to Saga Communications in August 1988. KRNQ was originally an automated Top 40 station. In January 1976, KRNQ began airing American Top 40 with Casey Kasem, and then Shadoe Stevens, until April 1989. In 1984, the automation ended and the station began using local DJs.  By the end of the 1980s, KRNQ was at or near the top of the local Arbitron ratings.

In 1991, due to Saga's desire to reach older listeners, Q102's youthful Top 40 format was changed to a slightly older Hot Adult Contemporary format and was known as "Q102/KRNQ, Today's Hits and Yesterday's Favorites."  KRNQ promised to play no rap (even though it was rarely played on the station after Saga's purchase in 1988) and no hard rock, both of which were very much a part of popular music at the time.  This format change left Des Moines with no contemporary hits outlet for nine years, until KKDM's flip from Alternative to Top 40/CHR in 1999. KRNQ became KSTZ on June 25, 1993. (The KRNQ call letters are now used for a station in Keokuk, Iowa.)

When the station reimaged itself to adult contemporary in 1993, the positioning statement the station used was "Superstars of the 70s,  80s and 90s" (with the 'STZ' in the call letters forming an abbreviation for 'stars').  The station later switched to "The Best Variety of the 80s, 90s and Today."  In 2001, the station began using the current positioning statement of "Today's Best Variety," returning to a Hot AC direction.  With KKDM becoming more of a factor since its 1999 debut, KSTZ has adjusted its playlist and adopted an Adult Top 40 format by adding a limited amount of adult-friendly rhythmic music with artists such Rihanna and The Black Eyed Peas in the mix.

Popular Contests

Pick Your Purse
Each Fall since 2005, the station has given away designer purses with the "Pick Your Purse" contest. Listeners enter on the station's website, then listen for their name to be read on the air. Once it is read, the listener has 10 minutes to call the station to claim the prize. The winner is allowed to pick from a selection of purses available on the station's website.

Secret Sounds of Summer
Listeners compete to guess the identity of a specific sound aired on the station.  Correct guesses are awarded a cash prize and generally qualify for an opportunity to win a car.

Christmas Wish
One of the station's longest running promotions, listeners write in asking for whatever they would want for holidays. Selected winners are called by station personalities and awarded prizes.

Brenda Schmitz Christmas Wish
In 2013, a Christmas Wish was received by the station from Brenda Schmitz. Brenda wrote the Christmas Wish in August 2011, one month before she died from ovarian cancer at the age of 46. She asked her friend to send her wish to the radio station once her husband, David, had found a new partner to help take care of their four sons. The wish went viral around the world and was picked up by many news outlets including CNN, Yahoo!, The Huffington Post, and Mashable, among others. The wish was for David and his new wife to take their sons to Disney World in Florida as well as other gifts for the family.

References

External links
Star 102.5 Website
Des Moines Radio Group: KSTZ
Des Moines Broadcasting KRNQ Website

Hot adult contemporary radio stations in the United States
STZ
Radio stations established in 1970
1970 establishments in Iowa